Littoraria pallescens is a species of sea snail, a marine gastropod mollusk in the family Littorinidae, the winkles or periwinkles.

Distribution
This marine species occurs off Vietnam, the Philippines and Indonesia.

Description

Ecology
Littoraria pallescens is a predominantly mangrove-associated species.

References

 Philippi, R.A. (1846). Descriptions of a new species of Trochus, and of eighteen new species of Littorina, in the collection of H. Cuming, Esq. Proc. Zool. Soc. Lond. 13: 138–143
 Ang, P. O.; Wong, C. K.; Lin, T. P.; Ma, W. C.; Hung, S. (2005). Biological Monitoring in Sha Chau and Lung Kwu Chau Marine Park. Submitted to Agriculture, Fisheries and Conservation Department, The Hong Kong SAR Government.
 Reid, D.G. (1986). The littorinid molluscs of mangrove forests in the Indo-Pacific region. British Museum (Natural History), London
 Reid, D.G. (2001). New data on the taxonomy and distribution of the genus Littoraria Griffith and Pidgeon, 1834 (Gastropoda: Littorinidae) in Indo-West Pacific mangrove forests. Nautilus. 115:115–139
 Liu, J.Y. [Ruiyu] (ed.). (2008). Checklist of marine biota of China seas. China Science Press. 1267 pp.
 Reid, D.G., Dyal, P., & Williams, S.T. (2010). Global diversification of mangrove fauna: a molecular phylogeny of Littoraria (Gastropoda: Littorinidae). Molecular Phylogenetics and Evolution. 55:185–201.
 Burgos A.L., 2013 Ethnoécologie d'une société mentawai : femmes, mangroves et coquillages de l'île de Siberut (Indonésie), vol. 1, p. 1–502

External links
  Reeve, L. A. (1857–1858). Monograph of the genus Littorina. In: Conchologia iconica, or, illustrations of the shells of molluscous animals, vol. 10, pls. 1–18 and unpaginated text. Reeve, London
 Reid D.G. (1989) The comparative morphology, phylogeny and evolution of the gastropod family Littorinidae. Philosophical Transactions of the Royal Society B 324: 1–110

Littorinidae
Gastropods described in 1846